Lions' Gate, also St Stephen's Gate, is one of the seven open Gates of the Old City of Jerusalem. It leads into the Muslim Quarter of the Old City.

History
The start of the traditional Christian observance of the last walk of Jesus from prison to crucifixion, the Via Dolorosa, begins at the Lions' Gate, called St Stephen's Gate by Christians. Carved into the wall above the gate are four lions, two on the left and two on the right. Suleiman the Magnificent had the carvings made to celebrate the Ottoman defeat of the Mamluks in 1517. Legend has it that Suleiman's predecessor Selim I dreamed of lions that were going to eat him because of his plans to level the city. He was spared only after promising to protect the city by building a wall around it. This led to the lion becoming the heraldic symbol of Jerusalem.

Historian Moshe Sharon notes the similarity of the sculpted felines to similar pairs at Jisr Jindas and Qasr al-Basha in Gaza. All represent the same Mamluk sultan, Baibars. Sharon estimates that they all date to approximately 1273 C.E.

The gate is part of the city's extant walls, built by Ottoman Sultan Suleiman in 1538. All together, the Old City walls contain 43 surveillance towers and 11 gates, seven of which are presently open.

In 1967, it was through this gate that Israeli paratroopers broke into the Old City of Jerusalem, occupied, along with the rest of East Jerusalem and the whole West Bank, from Jordan at the time.

See also 

 Gates of the Old City of Jerusalem

References

Bibliography

External links

Photos of the gate at the Manar al-Athar photo archive
 The Old City Gates: www.jewishvirtuallibrary.org 

Gates in Jerusalem's Old City Walls
Muslim Quarter (Jerusalem)